Mount Warner is an isolated mountain just south of the head of Arthur Glacier and 5 nautical miles (9 km) north of Mount Crow in the Ford Ranges, Marie Byrd Land. The Spaulding Rocks stand 11 nautical miles (20 km) northeast of the mountain.

Discovered by members of a geological party of the United States Antarctic Service (USAS) (1939–41) and named for Lawrence A. Warner, geologist at the USAS West Base and leader of the party which visited this mountain. 

Mountains of Marie Byrd Land